"Strange" is a song by Scottish band Wet Wet Wet, released as the second single from their fifth studio album, 10 (1997). It was released on 2 June 1997, charting at number 13 on the UK Singles Chart and becoming the group's 19th top-20 hit in the UK. Marti Pellow recorded his own version of the song for inclusion on his 2002 album, Marti Pellow Sings the Hits of Wet Wet Wet & Smile.

Track listings
UK CD1
 "Strange" (radio edit)
 "Lip Service" (live at Hook End)
 "Don't Want to Forgive Me Now" (live at Wembley)
 "Strange" (live at Hook End)

UK CD2
 "Strange" (radio edit)
 "If I Never See You Again" (live at Hook End)
 "Theme from Grand Prix"
 "Strange" (LP version)

UK cassette and European CD single
 "Strange" (radio edit)
 "Don't Want to Forgive Me Now" (live at Wembley)

Credits and personnel
Credits are lifted from the UK CD1 liner notes and the 10 booklet.

Studio
 Recorded between September and October 1996 at Sarm Hook End Manor (Checkendon, England)

Personnel

 Graeme Clark – writing, production
 Tommy Cunningham – writing
 Neil Mitchell – writing
 Marti Pellow – writing
 Graeme Duffin – all guitars, production
 Luís Jardim – percussion
 Paul Spong – trumpet
 Steve Sidwell – trumpet
 Mark Nightingale – trombone
 Jamie Talbot – saxophone
 Axel Kroell – co-production
 Bob Clearmountain – mixing
 Ian Morrow – programming
 Paul Wright – engineering
 Tim Wills – engineering assistant

Charts

References

1997 singles
1997 songs
Mercury Records singles
Songs written by Graeme Clark (musician)
Songs written by Marti Pellow
Songs written by Neil Mitchell (musician)
Songs written by Tommy Cunningham
Wet Wet Wet songs